Left-wing coalition (Italy) may refer to:
 The Left – The Rainbow, a left-wing electoral list running in 2008
 Left and Freedom, a left-wing electoral list running in 2009
 Anticapitalist and Communist List, a left-wing electoral list running in 2013
 Civil Revolution, a left-wing electoral list running in 2013
 The Other Europe, a left-wing electoral list running in 2014
 Free and Equal (Italy), a left-wing electoral list running in 2018
 Power to the People (Italy), a party turned far-left electoral list running in 2018
 For a Revolutionary Left, a far-left electoral list running in 2018
 The Left (Italy), a left-wing electoral list running in 2019
 People's Union (Italy), a left-wing electoral list running in 2022
 Greens and Left Alliance, a left-wing electoral list running in 2022